The 45th Fires Brigade is a modular field artillery brigade of the United States Army headquartered in Mustang, Oklahoma. It is a part of the Oklahoma Army National Guard.

Formed from elements of the disbanded 45th Infantry Division which saw action during World War II and the Korean War, along with the 45th Infantry Brigade Combat Team and 90th Troop Command, the 45th Fires Brigade was activated in 1968 as the 45th Field Artillery Group, later redesignated the 45th Field Artillery Brigade.  The unit was again redesignated 45th Fires Brigade in 2008 with the implementation of Army Transformation.

Just as the 45th IBCT and the 90th Troop Command, the brigade retained the shoulder sleeve insignia of the 45th Infantry Division, only designing and approving its own SSI in 1997.

Current Structure 
The 45th Field Artillery Brigade is a subordinate unit of the Oklahoma Army National Guard, headquartered in Mustang, Oklahoma. The brigade organically commands two battalions, a target acquisition battery, and a signal company. These units are:
 45th Field Artillery Brigade (45th FAB), Oklahoma Army National Guard
 Headquarters Battery, Oklahoma Army National Guard
  1st Battalion, 158th Field Artillery Regiment (1-158th FAR) (HIMARS) High Mobility Artillery Rocket System, Oklahoma Army National Guard
 271st Brigade Support Battalion (271st BSB), Oklahoma Army National Guard
 205th Signal Company, Oklahoma Army National Guard
 Battery B (Target Acquisition), 171st Field Artillery Regiment (B-171st FAR), Oklahoma Army National Guard

In addition, there are two affiliated field artillery battalions under administrative control of two maneuver enhancement brigades:
 110th Maneuver Enhancement Brigade (110th MEB), Missouri Army National Guard
  1st Battalion, 129th Field Artillery Regiment (1-129th FAR) (M777 A2)
 71st Expeditionary Military Intelligence Brigade (71st EMIB), Texas Army National Guard
  4th Battalion, 133rd Field Artillery Regiment (4-133rd FAR) (HIMARS) High Mobility Artillery Rocket System

History
The history of the 45th Fires Brigade can be traced back to the days following World War I when LTC William S. Key, I was appointed Captain of Field Artillery in the Oklahoma Army National Guard. He was directed to organize a light artillery battery at Wewoka, Oklahoma.  By 1920, Oklahoma had three regiments of artillery, of which, the 158th is the core of today's fires brigade.

45th Infantry Division

On 19 October 1920, the Oklahoma State militia was organized as the 45th Infantry Division of the Oklahoma Army National Guard and organized with troops from Arizona, Colorado, New Mexico, and Oklahoma. The division was organized and federally recognized as a US Army unit on 3 August 1923 in Oklahoma City, Oklahoma. Prior to World War II, the division was called on many times to maintain order in times of disaster and to keep peace during periods of political unrest. Oklahoma Governor John C. Walton used division troops to prevent the State Legislature from meeting when they were preparing to impeach him in 1923. Governor William H. Murray called out the guard several times during the depression to close banks, distribute food and once to force the State of Texas to keep open a free bridge over the Red River which Texas intended to collect tolls for, even after federal courts ordered the bridge not be opened.

The division would go on to see combat in World War II as one of four national guard divisions active during the war. The division was active for over five years, participating in eight campaigns, four amphibious assaults, for a total of 511 days of combat. Following World War II the division became an all-Oklahoma organization. In 1950, the division was also called into service during the Korean War, participating in four campaigns and fighting for 429 days.

Cold War years
In 1968, the division was disbanded and the 45th Fires Brigade was one of the units formed in its place.

The brigade did not participate in any overseas operations through the 1970s or 1980s, as the size of the active duty force negated the need for National Guard formations to be deployed during the relatively small contingencies of that period. Instead, the brigade was used to train active duty units, and other general peacetime missions within the United States. In 1991, the brigade became affiliated with the 1st Cavalry Division, providing training services for the division soldiers.

Desert Storm
The 158th was a late deploying unit for Operation Desert Shield in 1991. By the time the 1-158th Field Artillery came together in the Saudi desert, the ground offensive of Desert Storm was only days away. The l-158th was assigned to the 75th Field Artillery Brigade, and their purpose was to fire preparatory fires on Iraqi artillery positions and other targets the following day, 21 February. This was also the beginning of the battalion constantly being on the move. This battalion would support seven different higher headquarters throughout the unit's time in-theater: 3d Armored Division; VII Corps Artillery, 210th Field Artillery Brigade in the 2d Armored Cavalry Regiment, the 1st Infantry Division, and assigned in support of the 1st Cavalry Division. As part of VII Corps' repositioning of its units to the west in preparation for the "Hail Mary" tactic to defeat the Iraqi forces, A Battery, sent its advance party on a 95-mile desert march not knowing that within three days of that move, the battery would be the first Army National Guard unit to fire on the enemy.

On 16 February, Battery A engaged six enemy targets with 98 rockets. The next day the battery delivered 71 rockets on four targets and on 20 February, it launched 48 rockets against four more targets. The remainder of the 1-158th FA was unloading its launchers at Dammarn Port, Saudi Arabia. Battery B, and C Battery, soon began hitting enemy targets in preparation for the ground offensive. In total the 1-158 Field Artillery Oklahoma Army National Guard fired 903 rockets and traveled hundreds of kilometers in support of VII Corps operations.

Lineage and Honors

Lineage
 Organized and Federally recognized 5 August 1920 in the Oklahoma National Guard at Enid as Battery A, 2d Field Artillery
 Redesignated 10 October 1921 as Battery A, 189th Field Artillery, an element of the 45th Division
 Redesignated 1 May 1939 as Battery F, 189th Field Artillery
 Inducted into Federal service 16 September 1940 at Enid
 Reorganized and redesignated 11 February 1942 as Battery C, 202d Field Artillery, and relieved from assignment to the 45th Division 
(45th Division redesignated 23 February 1942 as the 45th Infantry Division)
 Reorganized and redesignated 1 March 1943 as Battery C, 202d Field Artillery Battalion
 Inactivated 24 November 1945 at Camp Bowie, Texas
 Reorganized and Federally recognized 13 November 1946 in the Oklahoma National Guard at Enid as Battery A, 189th Field Artillery Battalion, an element of the 45th Infantry Division
 Ordered into active Federal service 1 September 1950 at Enid
(Battery A, 189th Field Artillery Battalion [NGUS], organized and Federally recognized 11 December 1952 at Enid) 
 Released from active Federal service 30 April 1954 and reverted to state control; concurrently consolidated with Headquarters Battery, 189th Field Artillery Battalion (see ANNEX 1), and consolidated unit designated as Battery A, 189th Field Artillery Battalion; Federal recognition concurrently withdrawn from Battery A, 189th Field Artillery Battalion (NGUS) 
 Reorganized and redesignated 1 May 1959 as Headquarters Battery, 2d Battalion, 189th Artillery, an element of the 45th Infantry Division
 Reorganized and redesignated 1 April 1963 as Headquarters and Service Battery, 1st Battalion, 189th Artillery, an element of the 45th Infantry Division
 Consolidated 1 February 1968 with Battery C, 1st Battalion, 158th Artillery (organized and Federally recognized 1 November 1965 at Enid), and consolidated unit reorganized and redesignated as Headquarters Battery, 1st Battalion, 189th Artillery, and relieved from assignment to the 45th Infantry Division
 Redesignated 1 May 1972 as Headquarters Battery, 1st Battalion, 189th Field Artillery
 Consolidated 1 October 1996 with Headquarters and Headquarters Battery, 45th Field Artillery Brigade (see ANNEX 2), and consolidated unit designated as Headquarters and Headquarters Battery, 45th Field Artillery Brigade
 Ordered into active Federal service 15 March 2003 at Enid; released from active Federal service 27 May 2003 and reverted to state control
 Ordered into active Federal service 19 August 2008 at Enid
 Reorganized and redesignated 1 September 2008 as Headquarters and Headquarters Battery, 45th Fires Brigade
 Released from active Federal service 22 September 2009 and reverted to state control
 Location changed 1 July 2010 to Mustang
ANNEX 1
 Organized and Federally recognized 17 November 1921 in the Oklahoma National Guard at Enid as Headquarters Battery and Combat Train, 1st Battalion, 189th Field Artillery, an element of the 45th Division
 Reorganized and redesignated 1 November 1939 as Headquarters Battery, 189th Field Artillery
 Inducted into Federal service 16 September 1940 at Enid
 Redesignated 11 February 1942 as Headquarters Battery, 202d Field Artillery, and relieved from assignment to the 45th Division
(45th Division redesignated 23 February 1942 as the 45th Infantry Division)
 Reorganized and redesignated 1 March 1943 as Headquarters Battery, 202d Field Artillery Group
 Inactivated 28 November 1945 at Camp Kilmer, New Jersey
 Reorganized and Federally recognized 17 September 1946 in the Oklahoma National Guard at Enid as Headquarters Battery, 189th Field Artillery Battalion, an element of the 45th Infantry Division
 Ordered into active Federal service 1 September 1950 at Enid; released from active Federal service 30 April 1954 and reverted to state control
ANNEX 2
 Organized and Federally recognized 10 October 1921 in the Oklahoma National Guard at Enid as the Band Section, Service Battery, 2d Field Artillery
 Redesignated 14 October 1921 as the Band Section, Service Battery, 189th Field Artillery, an element of the 45th Division
 Reorganized and redesignated 1 July 1940 as the Band, 189th Field Artillery
 Inducted into Federal service 16 September 1940 at Enid
 Redesignated 11 February 1942 as the Band, 202d Field Artillery, and relieved from assignment to the 45th Division
(45th Division redesignated 23 February 1942 as the 45th Infantry Division)
 Reorganized and redesignated 1 February 1944 as the 203d Army Band
 Reorganized and redesignated 7 June 1944 as the 203d Army Ground Forces Band
 Inactivated 11 June 1946 in Italy
 Reorganized and Federally recognized 4 March 1947 in the Oklahoma National Guard at Enid as Company K, 179th Infantry, an element of the 45th Infantry Division
 Ordered into active Federal service 1 September 1950 at Enid
(Company K, 179th Infantry [NGUS], organized and Federally recognized 21 October 1952 at Enid) 
 Released from active Federal service 30 April 1954 and reverted to state control; Federal recognition concurrently withdrawn from Company K, 179th Infantry (NGUS)
 Consolidated 1 May 1959 with Headquarters and Headquarters Battery, 45th Division Artillery (see ANNEX 3), and consolidated unit reorganized and redesignated as Headquarters and Headquarters Battery, 45th Infantry Division Artillery
 Reorganized and redesignated 1 February 1968 as Headquarters and Headquarters Battery, 45th Artillery Group, and relieved from assignment to the 45th Infantry Division
 Redesignated 1 May 1972 as Headquarters and Headquarters Battery, 45th Field Artillery Group
 Redesignated 1 September 1978 as Headquarters and Headquarters Battery, 45th Field Artillery Brigade
ANNEX 3
 Organized and Federally recognized 17 September 1952 in the Oklahoma Army National Guard at Enid as Headquarters and Headquarters Battery, 45th Division Artillery (NGUS)
 Reorganized and redesignated 30 April 1954 as Headquarters and Headquarters Battery, 45th Division Artillery
HOME STATION: Mustang

Campaign Participation Credit
 World War II: Normandy; Northern France; Rhineland; Ardennes-Alsace; Central Europe
 Korean War: Second Korean Winter; Korea, Summer-Fall 1952; Third Korean Winter; Korea, Summer 1953
 War on Terrorism: Campaigns to be determined

Decorations
Army Superior Unit Award, Streamer embroidered 2005
Republic of Korea Presidential Unit Citation, Streamer embroidered KOREA 1951-1953

Heraldry

Shoulder Sleeve Insignia

Distinctive Unit Insignia

References

External links
Institute of Heraldry: 45th Fires Brigade
45th Fires Brigade homepage

045|045
FA 045
045
Military units and formations established in 1968